Fujio Dam  is a rockfill dam located in Hiroshima Prefecture in Japan. The dam is used for flood control and irrigation. The catchment area of the dam is 10 km2. The dam impounds about 9  ha of land when full and can store 870 thousand cubic meters of water. The construction of the dam was completed in 1974.

References

Dams in Hiroshima Prefecture